Michael Moreci is a comic author and novelist writing in the science fiction and horror genres. Notable original works include critically acclaimed military horror comic series Burning Fields and space comic series Roche Limit, which was included in Paste's "Required Reading: 50 of the Best Sci-Fi Comics". Moreci has written two Star Wars-inspired space opera novels - Black Star Renegades and We Are Mayhem.

Moreci has written canonical material for a number of franchises including Star Wars, Stranger Things and the DC Universe. In 2019 he wrote a graphic novel adaptation of Eoin Colfer's Artemis Fowl in promotion of Disney's 2020 film adaptation.

Personal life
Morechi was born and grew up in Chicago. He cites Kurt Vonnegut, Ray Bradbury and J. R. R. Tolkien as key influences.

Works

Novels
 The Throwaway (2018)
 Black Star Renegades (2019)
 We Are Mayhem (2020)

Comic Series

 Curse (2014)
 Roche Limit (2015)
 Burning Fields (2016)
 Artemis Fowl (2019)
 The Plot (2020)
 Archangel 8 (2020)

References

External links

 
 Goodreads

Living people
Year of birth missing (living people)